Han Fuju or Han Fu-chü (1890 – 24 January 1938) was a Kuomintang general in the early 20th century. He rose up the ranks of the Guominjun clique in the Warlord era but then went over to the Kuomintang, and held the position of military governor of Shandong from 1930 to 1938.  Han had one wife, two concubines, and four sons.

Biography

Early life 
Han Fuju was born in Dongshantai Village, Ba County, Hebei Province. He had had little aptitude for schooling. Nonetheless, while quite young, he had worked as a clerk in his hsien ("county") until his gambling debts forced him to run away and enlist in the army of General Feng Yu-hsiang. Han rose quickly, from clerk to chief clerk, to lieutenant, to captain, and after an uprising, to major. During the warlord upheavals in the 1920s, he emerged as commander of General Feng's 1st Army Group.

Governor and warlord 

In 1928, he was appointed chairman (governor) of Henan province by Feng, and in 1929, he was confirmed in office and concurrently named commanding general of the 11th Division. When the Christian general revolted later in the year, Han declared his allegiance to the central government of Chiang Kai-shek.  In the Central Plains War in 1930, Han fought against the rebel troops of Yen Hsi-shan and his former commander Feng Yu-hsiang in Shandong and was rewarded with appointment as governor of the province.

He took over Zhang Zongchang's role as the warlord in Shandong Province. In autumn 1932, unified the province after defeating the rival warlord Liu Zhennian, who controlled the eastern part of the province (in particular the sea port of Yantai) and was known as the "King of Eastern Shandong ". As governor, Han was a stern disciplinarian with the civil servants and the military. He had virtually wiped out banditry and traffic in narcotics in campaigns of suppression. By commercial operations, principally in cotton, tobacco, and real estate, he grew rich and gave generously to schools, hospitals, and civic improvements.

In the mid-1930s, he was the target of Japanese attempts to get him to incorporate his province of Shandong into one of the North China puppet states that they were attempting to construct. After the onset of the Second Sino-Japanese War, he commanded the 3rd Army Group and in 1937 was made Deputy Commander in Chief of the 5th War Area defending the lower Yellow River valley.

Downfall 
Han was suspected of having conducted secret negotiations with the Japanese to spare his province and his position of power. When the Japanese crossed the Yellow River, he abandoned his base in Jinan. Han abandoned his army on January 6 and fled to Kaifeng, where he was arrested on 11th and brought to Wuchang and was later executed by Chiang Kai-shek for disobeying orders from superior commanders and for retreating on his own accord.

Chiang did so to set an example for those not following his orders. According to one account, Han was executed in the sanctuary of the Changchun Temple, a Taoist temple at the outskirts of Wuchang (now, almost in the center of modern Wuhan) by a single pistol bullet that was fired into the back of his head by Chiang's chief of staff, General Hu Zongnan. There are only second-hand accounts of the execution.

Career 
1928-1930: Chairman of the Government of Henan Province
1930-1938: Governor of Shandong
1937: General Officer Commanding 3rd Route Army
1937-1938: Commander-in-Chief 3rd Army Group
1938: Deputy Commander-in-Chief 5th War Area
1938 Arrested and executed at a military conference in Hankou for failing to defend Shandong

Personal life 
Besides for his execution as a traitor, Han Fuju is remembered for his bad jokes and poetry. According to Historian Diana Lary, one of his best known poems was about the Daming Lake in Jinan, though the same poem has also been attributed to Zhang Zongchang by newspapers such as the Beijing Evening News and People's Daily.

Sources 

Republic of China warlords from Hebei
Executed military personnel
People executed by the Republic of China by firearm
Executed Republic of China people
1890 births
1938 deaths
Politicians from Langfang
Governors of Shandong
20th-century executions by China
Executed Chinese people
Executed people from Hebei
People from Bazhou, Hebei